Clive John Berghofer (born 4 March 1935) is an Australian property developer, politician and philanthropist. He was a Member of the Queensland Legislative Assembly, Alderman and Mayor of Toowoomba.

Early life
Clive Berghofer was born on 4 May 1935 in Toowoomba, Queensland, Australia.

Career
He served as an alderman on Toowoomba City Council from 1973 to 1982, serving as Toowoomba's 61st Mayor from 1982 to 1992. He was National Party MLA for Toowoomba South (1986–1991). On 23 March 1991 he was forced to vacate his seat in the Queensland Legislative Assembly, in order to retain his position as mayor after changes to the relevant legislation. National Party candidate Mike Horan won the resulting by-election on 18 May.

He now works as a real estate developer in his hometown of Toowoomba. Additionally, he owns apartments in Brisbane and the Gold Coast.

Philanthropy
He has made donations to CareFlight (now LifeFlight), a Queensland aero-medical charity. As a result, his name appears on some of their rescue helicopters. He also donated $10 million in 2001 and $50 million in 2013 to the Queensland Institute of Medical Research. As a result, the QIMR Berghofer Medical Research Institute is named in his honour.

Honours
 Medal of the Order of Australia, 26 January 1994, In recognition of service to local government and to the community.
 Australian Sports Medal, 30 August 2000, Does not play sport but supports many clubs. Acts as guarantor for clubs seeking to build facilities.
 Centenary Medal, 1 January 2001, For distinguished service to the community through funding research.
 Member of the Order of Australia, 12 June 2006, For service to the community through philanthropic support for medical research, health, sporting and educational organisations in Queensland.

Personal life
Berghofer currently resides in his hometown of Toowoomba. As of July 2014, he is worth an estimated AU$340 million.

See also
 Members of the Queensland Legislative Assembly, 1986-1989
 Members of the Queensland Legislative Assembly, 1989-1992

References

Living people
1935 births
Recipients of the Medal of the Order of Australia
Recipients of the Australian Sports Medal
Recipients of the Centenary Medal
Members of the Order of Australia
National Party of Australia members of the Parliament of Queensland
Mayors of Toowoomba
Queensland local councillors
20th-century Australian philanthropists
21st-century Australian philanthropists